Willemine Elisabeth Edzardine (Lita) de Ranitz (4 March 1876 – 21 July 1960) was a Dutch art collector.

Early life 
Lita de Ranitz was born in The Hague, daughter of Sebastiaan Mattheus Sigismund de Ranitz and Hermanne Louise Christine Thomassen à Thuessink van der Hoop.

Dollhouse collection 
Lita de Ranitz built her dollhouse collection from an early age, and continued to add to it through her travels, and by commissioning special items from craftsmen. Her husband and other artists made tiny original paintings for her collection. Her younger sister Anna embroidered tiny but elaborate rugs and curtains to contribute. She exhibited her most elaborate dollhouse in 1910 and 1911, and Queen Emma was among the guests attending the show.

Personal life 
Lita de Ranitz married Dutch artist Willem Bastiaan Tholen in 1919, as his second wife. She was widowed in 1931. She died in 1960, aged 84 years, in Amsterdam. Her collection was donated to the Costume Museum in The Hague, and after 1984 it became part of the holdings of the Historical Museum of the Hague, and were the focus of a 2018 exhibit.

References

External links 

 A video of Lita de Ranitz's 1910 Dollhouse in the Historical Museum of the Hague, at YouTube.

1876 births
1960 deaths
Art collectors from The Hague
Dollhouses